Nyctibatrachus is a genus of frogs endemic to the Western Ghats of southwestern India. Their common name is night frogs. Their scientific name also means "night frog", in reference to their habits and dark color. They are the only extant members of the monotypic subfamily Nyctibatrachinae. Currently, 35 species belong to Nyctibatrachus.

Description
Members of the genus Nyctibatrachus are robust-bodied frogs that range in size from small (snout–vent length <13 mm in Nyctibatrachus robinmoorei) to relatively large (up to 84 mm Nyctibatrachus karnatakaensis). The especially small species are among the smallest of all Indian frogs. They have a concealed tympanum, dorsum with longitudinal skin folds, femoral glands, and expanded finger and toes disks. They occur near streams in hilly evergreen forests and are nocturnal. Most species have amplexus but Nyctibatrachus humayuni does not; in this species the male moves over the eggs after the female has deposited them.

Species
The following species are recognised in the genus Nyctibatrachus:

References

External links

 
Nyctibatrachidae
Amphibians of India
Endemic fauna of the Western Ghats
Amphibian genera
Taxa named by George Albert Boulenger